Rialto (often The Rialto, or Rialto Towers) is a skyscraper located at 525 Collins Street, in the western side of the central business district of Melbourne, Victoria, Australia. It was the tallest office building in the Southern Hemisphere when it was constructed.

The Rialto featured Melbourne's first skyscraper public observation deck, which operated between 1994 and 31 December 2009. It was also the location of Melbourne's first Tower running event.

Background

The site of the whole Rialto development ran between Flinders Lane and Collins Street, and was occupied by several buildings including numerous small warehouses on Flinders Lane, with lanes between including and Winfield Square and Robbs Lane. On the corner of Collins and King Street stood Robb's Buildings, named for the owner, railway builder John Robb, a grand classical styled 5-storey Victorian office building designed by Thomas Watts and Sons in 1885, and one of the largest in the city at the time. Next to that along Collins Street stood two interwar buildings, then   the Rialto Building (1891) designed by William Pitt and the Winfield Building (1890) designed by Charles Debro & Richard Speight, both part of the five building Rialto building group, an historic streetscape along Collins Street running up to the 1880s Olderfleet Building to the east.

Through the late 1960s and early 1970s, National Mutual Life Association of Australasia purchased the various historic buildings on the site, but had to rethink plans when the Rialto and Winfield buildings were listed by the new Historic Buildings Preservation Council in 1974, and the National Trust of Victoria opposed the demolition of other buildings on the site.

Little progress was made until 1980 when the site was acquired by Grollo Australia in a joint venture with St Martin's Properties. Grocon successfully argued that Robb's Building stood in the way of its major three-tower proposal, which they modified to a two-tower proposal, but still demolished the Robbs building. A hotel was created utilising the whole of the long rear wing of the Rialto Building, the replacement of the rear wing of the Winfield Building, and the creation of an atrium between.

Construction

Designed by architects Gerard de Preu and Partners in association with Perrott Lyon Mathieson, the building was built between 1982 and 1986, opening in October 1986, and takes its name from the much older Rialto Building next door. The massive glass curtain wall façade of reinforced blue tinted mirrored glass is its central feature and changes colour during the day, ranging from a trademark dark blue to a brilliant gold during sunset.

Early tenants moved into the lower floors while the upper floors were still under construction in 1984.

Rialto Run-up
Previous winners include Robin Rishworth (1989,1990); Geoff Case (1991). The winner was awarded with a trip to New York City to compete in the Empire State Building race. The event was run until 2005 and competitors had to go up 1254 steps.

Observation Deck
Views of up to  can be had on a clear day. The floor is serviced by two passenger lifts. On 31 December 2009, the observation deck closed. In 2010, the fine dining restaurant, Vue de monde, and associated cocktail bar, Lui Bar, opened for trade on Level 55.

New Podium 
In 2015-17, the partly roofed, partly open forecourt-podium was replaced with a 5 level perimeter building containing offices, with retail at ground level, and an internal glass-roofed area between it, the towers, and the side wall of the original Victorian era Rialto building. This addition was designed by Woods Bagot architects.

Statistics

Rialto consists of two interconnected towers, North and South, with rooftop floors at Level 41 and Level 58 respectively. There are 36 passenger lifts,  of lift cables, 706 lift door openings and 1,450 staircase steps. The outer surface of the building has 13,000 windows. There are five basement levels of car park available for occupiers and casual users. It was the tallest for five years until being surpassed by 101 Collins Street in 1991. It is currently the tenth tallest building in Australia.

Gallery

See also

 Architecture of Melbourne
 Australian landmarks
 List of tallest buildings in Melbourne
 List of tallest buildings in Australia

References

External links

Rialto Towers
Melbourne Observation Deck
Walking Melbourne profile
Rialto Run Up
Grollo Group built & owns the Rialto Towers

Office buildings completed in 1986
Skyscrapers in Melbourne
Landmarks in Melbourne
Office buildings in Melbourne
Skyscraper office buildings in Australia
Collins Street, Melbourne
Buildings and structures in Melbourne City Centre
1986 establishments in Australia